Bramber  is a small community in the Canadian province of Nova Scotia, located in  The Municipality of the District of West Hants in Hants County. It is possibly named after Bramber, Sussex in England.

External links
 Bramber on Destination Nova Scotia

References

Communities in Hants County, Nova Scotia
General Service Areas in Nova Scotia